The 2016 UCI Road World Championships took place in Doha, Qatar, in October 2016. The championships was moved from the traditional September to October to avoid extreme hot and blustery weather. The event consisted of a road race, a team time trial and a time trial for elite men and women and a road race and a time trial for men under-23, junior men and junior women. It was the 89th Road World Championships and the first time that Qatar and the Middle East hosted the championships.

Bidding
Qatar was announced as the host during the 2012 UCI Road World Championships in the Netherlands. Norway also made a bid but was unsuccessful. Norway will now be the host of the 2017 UCI Road World Championships.

UCI WorldTeam boycott of team time trial
In August 2016 the AIGCP approved a motion for all UCI WorldTeams to boycott the time trial event, due to the UCI insisting that WorldTeams should compete in the event as a requirement of granting a WorldTeam licence without providing a participation allowance to teams, as is the case with other UCI World Tour races. It was reported that the UCI Professional Continental teams attending the AIGCP General Assembly also supported the motion. The UCI expressed disappointment with the move and stated that it "continued to expect excellent participation in this year's UCI Road World Championships Team Time Trial".

Schedule
All times are in Arabia Standard Time (UTC+3).

Courses
The races primarily started and finished in the capital city of Doha, the home base for the Tour of Qatar. However, UCI sport and technical director Philippe Chevallier stated in June 2013 that the courses did not meet the requirements for a world championship and it had been decided to construct a hilly purpose-built course, like had been done for the 1980 Summer Olympics. Despite this, in February 2014 Sheikh Khalid Bin Ali Al Thani, the president of the Qatar Cycling Federation, said that the organisers would not create a purpose-built course for the World Championships due to a lack of time.

The route for the Worlds road races was presented in February 2015, which was made up of a loop of  through the desert and a finishing circuit in Doha city centre, including  of cobblestones. However it was also noted that the lack of long straight sections meant that the effect of the crosswinds frequently occurring in Qatar would be significantly lessened, reducing the race's unpredictability.

The start of the men's race was also moved to the Aspire Zone, with the riders heading out northwards towards Al Khor and returning to Doha.

Events summary

Elite events

Under-23 events

Junior events

Medal table

Broadcasting
Live coverage

Austria: ORF Sport +
Belgium: Canvas, Eén, La Deux
Brazil: SporTV, SporTV 2
Brunei: Astro SuperSport 2
Canada: RDS, RDS2
China: LeSports
Czech Republic: ČT Sport
Denmark: TV 2 Sport, (Internet: TV2 Play)
Estonia: Viasat Sport Baltic
France: beIN Sports 2, France 3
Germany: Eurosport 1
Hungary: Sport1, Sport2
India: Sony SIX
Ireland: Eurosport
Israel: Sport 2
Italy: Rai Sport 1
Japan: Speed Channel, NHK BS1
Latvia: Viasat Sport Baltic
Lithuania: Viasat Sport Baltic
Malaysia: Astro SuperSport 2
MENA (Pan Middle-East): beIN Sports, Alkass
Netherlands: NPO 1
New Zealand: Sky Sport
Norway: TV 2, TV 2 Sportskanalen
PAN Africa: SuperSport
Portugal: RTP 2, (Internet: RTP Play)
Russia: Arena/Planeta
Slovakia: Dvojka
Spain: Teledeporte
Sweden: TV3 Sport, TV10
Switzerland: RSI La 2, RTS Deux, SRF zwei
Turkey: NTV Spor
United Kingdom: BBC Red Button, Eurosport
United States: Universal HD, (Internet: liveextra.nbcsports.com)
Worldwide internet: tv.uci.ch

Other TV partners

Polsat Sport Extra (Poland)
Sport Klub (Bosnia, Croatia, Hungary, Kosovo, Macedonia, Montenegro, Poland, Serbia, Slovenia)
Sportsnet One (Canada)
SBS (Australia)
TDN (Mexico)
DirecTV (PAN America)
RCN Televisión (Colombia)

Sources

References

External links

 
 Event page at UCI.ch
 Official results of official time keeper Tissot Timing

 
2016 in Qatari sport
2016 in road cycling
21st century in Doha
International cycle races hosted by Qatar
October 2016 sports events in Asia
2016